The discography of New Zealand boy band Titanium, formed in Auckland in 2012, consists of a studio album, six official singles and five music videos. They signed with record label, Illegal Musik after being formed by a local radio competition from The Edge. They subsequently signed with Warner Music. As of November  2012, Titanium have sold over twenty thousand singles.

The group's debut studio album All for You was released worldwide in December 2012.
The leading single "Come On Home" was a national hit, reaching number one on the New Zealand Singles Chart and it has since been certified platinum by the Recording Industry Association of New Zealand (RIANZ). Subsequent singles "I Won't Give Up" and "Sky" both became top twenty hits in New Zealand.
Titanium made history when they became the first New Zealand band to have three songs in the Top 40 Singles Chart at one time. In 2013, "Soundtrack to Summer" and "Tattoo" the succeeding singles, were moderate successes.

Albums

Singles

Promotional singles

Music videos

References

Discography
Pop music group discographies